Akşehir is a town in Turkey.

Akşehir may also refer to one of the following places in Turkey:

Akşehir district
Lake Akşehir